Alexander County is the name of two counties in the United States:

Alexander County, Illinois 
Alexander County, North Carolina